Novodevichy Cemetery is a cemetery in Moscow. It lies next to the southern wall of the 16th-century Novodevichy Convent, which is the city's third most popular tourist site.

History 
The cemetery was designed by Ivan Mashkov and inaugurated in 1898. Its importance dates from the 1930s, when the necropolises of the medieval Muscovite monasteries (Simonov, Danilov, Donskoy) were scheduled for demolition. Only the Donskoy survived the Joseph Stalin era relatively intact. The remains of many famous Russians buried in other abbeys, such as Nikolai Gogol and Sergey Aksakov, were disinterred and reburied at the Novodevichy.

A 19th-century necropolis within the walls of the Novodevichy convent, which contained the graves of about 2000 Russian noblemen and university professors, also underwent reconstruction. The vast majority of graves were destroyed. It was at that time that the remains of Anton Chekhov were moved outside the monastery walls. His grave served as the kernel of the so-called "cherry orchard" – a section of the cemetery which contains the graves of Constantin Stanislavski and the leading actors of his company.

Interments 

During the Soviet Union, burial in the Novodevichy Cemetery was second in prestige only to burial in the Kremlin Wall Necropolis. Among the Soviet leaders, Nikita Khrushchev and Mikhail Gorbachev would be buried there. Since the fall of the Soviet Union, the Kremlin Wall is no longer used for burials and the Novodevichy Cemetery is used for only the most symbolically significant burials. In 1997, former premier Nikolai Tikhonov was buried in the cemetery at state expense (since he didn't have any money of his own). In April 2007, within one week both the first President of the Russian Federation Boris Yeltsin and cellist Mstislav Rostropovich were buried there.

Today, the cemetery holds the tombs of Russian authors, musicians, playwrights, and poets, as well as famous actors, political leaders, and scientists. More than 27,000 are buried at Novodevichy. There is scant space for more burials. A new national cemetery is under construction in Mytishchi north of Moscow. Notable burials include Dmitry Shostakovich, Sergei Prokofiev and Anton Chekhov.

The cemetery has a park-like ambience, dotted with small chapels and large sculpted monuments. It is divided into the old (Divisions 1–4), new (Divisions 5–8) and newest (Divisions 9–11) sections; maps are available at the cemetery office.

Monuments

Notable graves

The following noteworthy graves, among others, can be found at Novodevichy Cemetery:

1850s
 Nikolai Gogol (1809–1852)
 Sergey Aksakov (1791–1859)
1900s
 Vladimir Solovyov (philosopher) (1853–1900)
 Anton Chekhov (1860–1904)
1910s
 Valentin Serov (1865–1911)
1930s
 Vladimir Mayakovsky (1893–1930)
 Nikolay Andreyev (1873–1932)
 Nadezhda Alliluyeva (1901–1932)
 Konstantin Stanislavski (1863–1938)
1940s
 Mikhail Bulgakov (1891–1940)
 Mikhail Kaganovich (1888–1941)
 Ivan Shadr (1887–1941)
 Demyan Bedny (1883–1945)
 Nikolai Podvoisky (1880–1948)
 Sergei Eisenstein (1898–1948)
 Yevgeniy Abalakov (1907–1948)
1950s
 Vera Mukhina (1889–1953)
 Sergei Prokofiev (1891–1953)
 Aleksey Abrikosov (1875–1955)
 Karo Halabyan (1897–1959)
 Daniil Andreyev (1906–1959)
1960s
 Vsevolod Aksyonov (1902–1960)
 Mira Mendelson (1915–1963)
 Ivan Agayants (1911–1968)
 Vasily Azhayev (1915–1968)
 Ilya Ehrenburg (1891–1967)
1970s
 Abram Isaakovich Alikhanov (1904–1970)
 Nikolai Basistiy (1898–1971)
 Sergey Konenkov (1874–1971)
 Nikita Khrushchev (1894–1971)
 Andrei Abrikosov (1906–1973)
 Averky Aristov (1903–1973)
 Nikolay Kuznetsov (1904–1974)
 Yevgeny Vuchetich (1908–1974)
 Nikolai Bulganin (1895–1975)
 Dmitri Shostakovich (1906–1975)
 Pyotr Koshevoy (1904–1976)
1980s
 Filipp Golikov (1900–1980)
 Nikolai Podgorny (1903–1983)
 Nikolai Tomsky (1900–1984)
 Pavel Batov (1897–1985)
 Kirill Moskalenko (1902–1985)
 Vyacheslav Molotov (1890–1986)
 Andrei Gromyko (1909–1989)
1990s
 Semyon Kurkotkin (1917–1990)
 Grigori Abrikosov (1932–1993)
 Boris Alexandrovich Alexandrov (1905–1994)
 Mikhail Anikushin (1917–1997)
 Nikolai Tikhonov (1905–1997)
 Yuri Nikulin (1921–1997)
 Raisa Gorbacheva (1932–1999)
2000s
 Sergey Afanasyev (1918–2001)
 Alexander Lebed (1950–2002)
 Lev Kerbel (1917–2003)
 Mstislav Rostropovich (1927–2007)
 Boris Yeltsin (1931–2007)
 Lyudmila Zykina (1929–2009)
 Vyacheslav Tikhonov (1928–2009)
2010s
 Vladimir Arnold (1937–2010)
 Lyudmila Gurchenko (1935–2011)
 Victor Merzhanov (1919–2012)
 Sergey Sokolov (1911–2012)
 Ernst Neizvestny (1925–2016)
 Yury Mikhailovich Luzhkov (1936–2019)
2020s
 Vladimir Zhirinovsky (1946–2022)
 Mikhail Gorbachev (1931–2022)
 Inna Churikova (1943–2023)

See also
 Sainte-Geneviève-des-Bois Russian Cemetery
 Federal Military Memorial Cemetery
 Kremlin Wall Necropolis

References

External links
 Unofficial site. Hi-resolution photos
 
 Famous and picturesque (24) memorials photographed June 2005
 Novodevichii Cemetery – article from the Great Soviet Encyclopedia
 Novodevichy Cemetery: Where History sleeps (video) 

Cemeteries in Moscow
 
1898 establishments in the Russian Empire
Cultural heritage monuments of federal significance in Moscow